"Living in the Past" is a song by British progressive rock group Jethro Tull. It is one of the band's best-known songs, and it is notable for being written in the unusual  time signature, though it is properly felt as a very distinct  +  syncopated rhythm. The  time signature is quickly noted from the beginning rhythmic bass pattern.

Composition and recording
According to the composer, Ian Anderson, he wrote the tune in approximately one hour in his room at a Holiday Inn 'on the banks of the Charles River,' Boston, Massachusetts, on 12 February 1969. He and his manager, Terry Ellis, were checking in 'a day off here before the show,' ahead of a three-day residency 13 – 15 February 1969 at the Boston Tea Party rock club. When he handed it to Ellis later, he replied, 'Wow! I'll book a studio next week, when we we’re in the New York area.' 

At the end of the East Coast leg of their US tour, the backing tracks were recorded at Vantone Sound Studio, West Orange, New Jersey on 3 March 1969 (described by Anderson as a "cheap studio in New Jersey.") Apparently, much of the recording was of "a small local ensemble of session musicians – the cheapest we could find," and later overdubbed by band members. Anderson described overdubbing his vocals in San Francisco during mid-March; but conflicting reports identify 18 March at United Western Recorders, Los Angeles, California, as correct. It was also the date "Driving Song" was recorded, released as the b-side of Jethro Tull's fourth single, "Living in the Past", on 2 May 1969 to UK audiences. Meanwhile, the band returned to London in mid-April to begin work on their second album, Stand Up.

After reaching number 3 on the UK Singles Chart, it was released in several other countries, but only promotionally in the United States in July 1969. It was not until October 1972 that it was commercially released in the US, as the lead single and title track of Living in the Past, a double compilation LP of the band's UK-only releases and outtakes recorded from 1968 to 1971. It became the band's first Top 20 hit in the US, peaking at #11. The 1972 version was remixed, replacing a flute overdub with an organ part. In 2001, it was included as a "bonus track" for the CD reissue of Stand Up. A Steven Wilson remix "sympathetic to both the original and later mixes" was included on the 2016 "Elevated Edition" reissue, alongside flat transfers of the original 1969 mono and (promo) stereo mixes.

"Living in the Past" was ranked the fifth best Jethro Tull song by Rock – Das Gesamtwerk der größten Rock-Acts im Check.

Anderson has described the song as a critical reflection of the hippie lifestyle and a general naivete of the era:

Chart performance

Weekly charts

Year-end charts

Release history
Single: "Living in the Past" / "Driving Song" (Island WIP 6056, 2 May 1969)
Single: "Living in the Past" / "Christmas Song" (USA) (Chrysalis 2006 10 October 1972)
Single: "Living in the Past" / "Requiem" (Chrysalis CHS 2081, 16 January 1976)
Single: "Living in the Past" / "Hard Liner" (Chrysalis CHS 3970, 1993)
Single: "Living in the Past" / "Witch's Promise" / "Teacher" / "Life is a Long Song" (April 2013, limited edition vinyl)

Personnel

Jethro Tull
 Ian Anderson – flute, lead vocals
 Glenn Cornick – bass guitar
 Martin Barre – guitar
 Clive Bunker – drums, percussion

Additional personnel
 Lou Toby – arranged and conducted strings

Cover versions
The song was first covered as an instrumental by CCS in 1970. Other cover versions include:
Billie Davis (1970)
Maynard Ferguson (1971)
Midge Ure (1985)
Cud (band) (1989 - As a B side to "Only (a Prawn in Whitby)" and later on their "Rich & Strange: Anthology" album)
Royal Philharmonic Orchestra (1993)
The Connells (1994)
Francis Dunnery (1994 – with entirely rewritten lyrics)
Keith Emerson (1996 – in the tribute album To Cry You A Song – A collection of Tull Tales)

See also
 List of musical works in unusual time signatures

References

External links
 JETHRO TULL 7" SINGLES ARCHIVE - 1970 to 1972

1969 singles
Jethro Tull (band) songs
Songs written by Ian Anderson
Song recordings produced by Ian Anderson
1969 songs
Island Records singles
Reprise Records singles
Chrysalis Records singles